Ponsonby Britt was the credited—but fictional—executive producer of the television series The Rocky and Bullwinkle Show, Fractured Flickers, Hoppity Hooper, and George of the Jungle.

In 1959, Jay Ward and Bill Scott invented the name "Ponsonby Britt, Limited" as the new title of their corporation. Britt eventually supposedly became an Officer of the Order of the British Empire (OBE) and was retained in the cartoon's closing credits as an in-joke. Bill Scott was quoted as saying, "We had no executive producer, so we felt we should make one up." Britt even had an "official" biography used in press releases.

The name Ponsonby was used by various famous people and places, mostly in the 17th, 18th and 19th centuries.

References

External links
 

American television producers
Nonexistent people used in jokes
Rocky and Bullwinkle characters
Fictional producers